Sofia Larsen (born 1972) is a Swedish Centre Party politician, member of the Riksdag since 1998.

External links
Sofia Larsen at the Riksdag website
Sofia Larsen at Centerpartiet's website

1972 births
21st-century Swedish women politicians
Living people
Members of the Riksdag 1998–2002
Members of the Riksdag 2002–2006
Members of the Riksdag 2006–2010
Members of the Riksdag from the Centre Party (Sweden)
Örebro University alumni
Women members of the Riksdag